Gertrud Schmidt (born 18 July 1942) is a German sprinter. She competed in the women's 400 metres at the 1964 Summer Olympics.

References

External links
 

1942 births
Living people
Athletes (track and field) at the 1964 Summer Olympics
German female sprinters
Olympic athletes of the United Team of Germany
Sportspeople from Łódź Voivodeship
People from Ozorków
Olympic female sprinters